The Social Democratic Movement – Green Party of São Tomé and Príncipe (MSD–PVSTP) is a São Toméan green political party, founded 4 November 2017. Its current president is Elsa Garrido and its vice-president is Miques João.

References

Political parties in São Tomé and Príncipe
Political parties established in 2017
Green parties in Africa